The 40M Nimród was a World War II Hungarian self-propelled anti-aircraft gun based on a license-built copy of the Swedish Landsverk L-62 Anti I SPAAG but with a new turret, and developed independently. Originally, it was intended to be used both in the anti-aircraft and tank destroyer roles, but it proved to be ineffective against Soviet tanks like the KV-1 tank. Therefore, it was primarily utilized against lightly armored vehicles and for air defense.

Design 
The 40M Nimród was a license-built variant of the Landsverk L-62 Anti I SPAAG. The L-62 Anti I was based on the chassis of the Landsverk L-60 tank which was already produced under license in Hungary as the 38M Toldi.

The L-62 did differ though from the original L-60 chassis. It was longer and wider and had one more roadwheel per side. Besides that, the 40M Nimród differed on its own from the original L-62 Anti I design. While the chassis was basically the same as the L-62 Anti I, although utilizing parts from the 38M Toldi, the turret was modified to house one more crew member from the original 5 of the L-62 Anti I. The crew of the 40M Nimród consisted of six men: commander, driver, two loaders and two gunners.

The vehicle's armament consisted of a Hungarian license-built Bofors 40 mm L/60 gun, in Hungarian service designated as 40 mm 36M (model of 1936), a gravity fed gun which had a rate of fire of 120 to 140 rounds per minute depending on the firing angle, which fired conventional ammunition at a muzzle velocity of almost . Ammunition for the gun consisted primarily of conventional high-explosive fragmentation and armor-piercing rounds, but also a specialized anti-tank round developed indigenously in Hungary. The Nimrod carried 640 rounds, split into 4 stowages of 160 rounds each.

Late in the war, the vehicle was issued with a  muzzle loaded rifle grenade (or "shaft grenade" when referring to cannon calibers) designated 42M. This was a German Stielgranate 41 which had been modified to mount the 40 mm 36M gun instead of the German 3.7 cm Pak 36. It consisted of a German 15 cm hollow charge artillery shell (I.Gr. 39 Hl/A) mounted on a fin-stabilized tube meant to fit over the muzzle of the gun, and was launched by the use of a specialized blank cartridge loaded in the main gun. The 42M is often found under the name "Kerngranate", which is German for Core Shell.

Service history 
The 40M Nimród was manufactured by the Manfred Weiss Works. A first batch of 46 vehicles powered by a German Büssing-NAG L8V/36TR engine was followed by another batch of 89 vehicles powered by a Hungarian Ganz IP VGT 107 Type II (built under license from Büssing-NAG).

Although it was originally intended for anti-tank use, in 1943 the 40M Nimród was reclassified for anti-aircraft use; as it was unable to penetrate the armor of the tanks in use by the Red Army.

The following units have employed this vehicle:
 51st Heavy Armor Battalion, 1st Hungarian Armored Division
 52nd Heavy Armor Battalion, 2nd Hungarian Armored Division
 1st Hungarian Cavalry Division

A total of 135 Nimrods were built, most of which were deployed by the 51st and 52nd Armored Autocannon Battalions of the 1st and 2nd Hungarian Armoured Divisions, respectively. Nimrod batteries attached to armored and motorized battalions were allocated six vehicles each.  A platoon consisted of two vehicles.

Gallery

Comparable vehicles
 Möbelwagen
 Ostwind
 M19 Multiple Gun Motor Carriage
 Crusader Mk. III Anti-Aircraft Tank Mk. I
 ZSU-37

References

Notes

Bibliography 
 The Royal Hungarian Army, 1920-1945, Volume II, Hungarian Mobile Forces, by Dr. Peter Mujzer
 A Magyar Királyi Honvédség Fegyverzete, by Attila Bonhardt, Gyula Sárhidai and László Winkler
 Becze, Csaba. Magyar Steel. Mushroom Model Publications. Sandomierz 2006

External links 

Hungarian WWII AFVs
Pictures from Zrinyi Miklos National Defence University

Tanks of Hungary
Armoured fighting vehicles of Hungary
World War II self-propelled anti-aircraft weapons
40 mm artillery
Military vehicles introduced from 1940 to 1944
SPGs. SPAs. Armored cars and trucks of 1940